Patric (born 1947) is an Occitan singer. He is one of the main figures of Nòva cançon, a music phenomenon promoting Occitanism. He's notable for several songs, for example his 2010 cover of the song "Bella ciao" in Occitan language.

References

External links
  (in French)
Biography on Aura Occitània

Occitan-language singers
Living people
1947 births
20th-century French male singers